Save the Children is the nineteenth studio album by American singer-songwriter Bobby Womack. The album was released in 1989, by SOLAR Records.

Track listing

Personnel
Bobby Womack - vocals, guitar
Curtis Womack, Friendly Womack, Jr. - vocals on "Baby I'm Back"
Carlos Santana - guitar on "Too Close for Comfort" and "Tough Job"
Blake Smith - guitar
Ray Gilliard - bass guitar
Alicia McCracken, Frank Hamilton, Patrick Moten - keyboards
Ananias Chambers, Gus Anthony Flores - percussion
Bernard Baisden, Gerald Albright, Joe Campbell, Lesli Carroll, Nolan Smith, Rastine Calhoun - horns
Alice Echols, Brandy Diana Moss, Brenda Lee Eager, Hillard Wilson, Lana Clarkson, Michelle Layborn, Pamela Starks, Patricia Henley - backing vocals
Brad Cole, Cecil Womack, Frank "Rusty" Hamilton, William Zimmerman - programming
Ron Wood - cover painting

References

1989 albums
Bobby Womack albums
Albums produced by Bobby Womack